Mike or Michael Powers may refer to:

 Mike Powers (baseball) (1906–1983), American right fielder in Major League Baseball
 Mike Powers (soccer) (born 1957), retired American soccer midfielder
 Mike Powers (politician) (born 1962), American politician in Wisconsin
 Doc Powers (Michael Riley Powers, 1870–1909), American Major League Baseball player
 Michael R. Powers (born 1959), American professor of insurance and author
 Mike Powers, county executive officer in the Ventura County, California#Government.